Lomas Academy was a football team created by members of the Lomas Athletic Club in order to have another team of the institution competing at the championships organised by the Argentine Football Association.

History
The team was registered in 1895 making its debut that same year, where it finished 2nd after its "elder brother" Lomas AC which was the champion. One year later, Lomas Academy won its first and only title, relegating Lomas AC to the third place. The runner-up was defunct team Flores Athletic. Despite its successful seasons at the top category of Argentine football, Lomas Academy would not play an official tournament again. Although no records survive, it is believed that the team was dissolved soon after winning the title.

Titles
Primera División (1): 1896

See also
 Lomas Athletic Club

References

l
a